Ixeridium dentatum, the toothed ixeridium, is a species of flowering plant in the family Asteraceae, native to East Asia (China, Japan, Korea, and Russian Far east).

It is a perennial plant whose leaves and stems and produce a white juice with a bitter taste.

References

Cichorieae
Plants described in 1784